The knockout phase of the 2010–11 Indonesia Super League U-21 began on 4 May 2011 and will conclude on 8 May 2011 with the final at Soemantri Brodjonegoro Stadium in Jakarta, Indonesia. The knockout phase involves the four teams who finished in the top two in each of their groups in the second group stage.

Starting times up to end of May are WIB (UTC+7).

Round and draw dates
All draws held at PSSI headquarters in Jakarta, Indonesia.

Qualified teams

Bracket

Semi-finals
The 2011 Indonesia Super League U-21 Semi-final will be played on 5 May 2011 at Soemantri Brodjonegoro Stadium in Jakarta, Indonesia.

Third placed
The 2011 Indonesia Super League U-21 Third placed will be played on 8 May 2011 at Soemantri Brodjonegoro Stadium in Jakarta, Indonesia.

Final

The 2011 Indonesia Super League U-21 Final will be played on 8 May 2011 at Soemantri Brodjonegoro Stadium in Jakarta, Indonesia.

References

External links
Indonesia Super League standings (including U-21 ISL)

Knockout